Lingua Mortis is the eleventh full-length album by the German heavy metal band Rage, released in 1996. It's the band's first collaboration with the Prague Symphony Orchestra, which played with the band Rage's songs re-arranged for a classic orchestra. The album consists of re-recorded songs from the previous album, Black in Mind and an epic medley of songs from recent albums to that time.

Track listing

Personnel 
Band members
Peter "Peavy" Wagner – vocals, bass
Spiros Efthimiadis – guitars
Sven Fischer – guitars
Chris Efthimiadis – drums

Additional musicians
 Christian Wolff – piano
 Symphonic Orchestra of Prague conducted by Markus Stollenwerk

Production
 Ulli Pössell – producer, engineer, mixing
 Christian Wolff – producer, orchestral arrangements
 Peter Dell – cover art

References 

Rage (German band) albums
1996 albums
GUN Records albums